Catenella is a genus of red algae belonging to the family Caulacanthaceae.

The genus has almost cosmopolitan distribution.

Species:

Catenella caespitosa 
Catenella impudica

References

Gigartinales
Red algae genera